Ayumu (written: 歩 or 歩夢) is a masculine Japanese given name. Notable people with the name include:

, Japanese rugby union player
, Japanese snowboarder
, Japanese baseball player
, Japanese footballer
, Japanese footballer
, Japanese shogi player
, Japanese voice actor
, Japanese footballer
, Japanese voice actor
, Japanese snowboarder
, Japanese playwright, director, actor, and theatre producer
, Japanese motorcycle racer
, Japanese footballer
, Japanese footballer
, Japanese anime director

Fictional characters
In fiction, Ayumu tends to be a more gender-neutral name.
, protagonist of the light novel series Kore wa Zombie Desu ka?
, character in the manga series Soredemo Ayumu wa Yosetekuru
, character in the manga series Azumanga Daioh
, character in the manga series Hayate the Combat Butler
, a character in the media project Nijigasaki High School Idol Club

See also
Ayumu (chimpanzee)

Japanese masculine given names